"Still Frame" is the second single from American rock band Trapt's eponymous debut album. Released on May 20, 2003, it was a hit on rock radio stations and reached No. 1 on the Billboard Hot Mainstream Rock Tracks chart.

Charts

References

Trapt songs
Song recordings produced by Garth Richardson
2003 singles
2002 songs